In arithmetic geometry, Faltings' product theorem gives sufficient conditions for a subvariety of a product of projective spaces to be a product of varieties in the projective spaces.

 and  gave explicit versions of Faltings' product theorem.

References

Diophantine approximation
Theorems in number theory